Vulqano Park Is an amusement park in Quito, Ecuador. The park is part of a much larger entertainment complex named the TelefériQo. It closed in 2020 due to economic losses due to the COVID-19 pandemic. Later on August 30, 2021, the amusement park announced its reopening on its Facebook page.

Description
The park contains 24 attractions and two roller coasters that are aimed at all age groups. Attractions have various fees, and the park sells daily passes that include all mechanical rides.

External links
Vulqano Park
Vulqano Park closed

Buildings and structures in Quito
2005 establishments in Ecuador
Amusement parks in Ecuador
Tourist attractions in Quito